Dee Delaney (born February 20, 1995) is an American football cornerback for the Tampa Bay Buccaneers of the National Football League (NFL). He played college football at The Citadel and Miami.

High school
A native of Seabrook, South Carolina, he attended Whale Branch Early College High School where he earned 14 varsity letters in football, basketball, baseball and track. As a Wide Receiver and Kick Returner he was named Region Offensive Player of the Year as a senior and invited to play in the North-South All Star Game. He was also an All-Region selection in basketball and baseball as well as being a member of the first place 4x100 relay team on the Class A state championship track team.

College career

The Citadel
Delaney began his collegiate career at The Citadel, where he was a 3-year starter and 3-time All-Southern Conference selection as well as a 2-time Walter Camp FCS All-American; he was also named to the Associated Press FCS All-America team and garnered All-America honors from College Football Madness, STATS, Athlon and HERO.  His 13 interceptions rank second in school history.

Miami
After graduation, Delaney used his final year of eligibility to play for the University of Miami as a graduate student; he started six games, collecting one interception and a fumble recovery as the Hurricanes advanced to the Atlantic Coast Conference Championship Game and played Wisconsin in the Capital One Orange Bowl.

Professional career

Jacksonville Jaguars
Delaney signed with the Jacksonville Jaguars as an undrafted free agent on April 28, 2018. He failed to make the Jaguars' 53-man roster out of training camp, but was subsequently signed to the team's practice squad on September 2. Delaney was promoted to the Jaguars' active roster from the practice squad on October 25, 2018. Delaney made his NFL debut on October 28, 2018 against the Philadelphia Eagles at Wembley Stadium in London. He was waived by the Jaguars on November 13, 2018, and was re-signed to the practice squad. He was promoted back to the active roster on December 1, 2018. He was waived two days later.

Miami Dolphins
On December 4, Delaney was claimed off waivers by the Miami Dolphins, but was waived four days later and re-signed to the practice squad. He signed a reserve/future contract with the Dolphins on February 1, 2019 He was waived on May 1, 2019.

New York Jets
On July 30, 2019, Delaney was signed by the New York Jets. Delaney was waived by the Jets on August 26, 2019.

Washington Redskins
On December 24, 2019, Delaney was signed by the Washington Redskins. He was released on March 23, 2020.

Tampa Bay Buccaneers
On May 25, 2021, Delaney signed with the Tampa Bay Buccaneers. He had his first start as a professional on October 24, 2021 against the Chicago Bears and he caught his first career interception in that game.

References

External links
Citadel Bulldogs bio
Miami Hurricanes bio

1995 births
Living people
Players of American football from South Carolina
Sportspeople from Beaufort, South Carolina
American football cornerbacks
The Citadel Bulldogs football players
Miami Hurricanes football players
Jacksonville Jaguars players
Miami Dolphins players
New York Jets players
Washington Redskins players
Tampa Bay Buccaneers players